RC Vannes is a French rugby union club based in Vannes currently competing in Pro D2.

The team usually competed in the third tier of French rugby, Fédérale 1. During the 2015–16 season, they beat RC Massy during the Fédérale 1 promotion semi-finals automatically accessing to the 2016–17 Pro D2, an historical reach for a Breton rugby team.

Current standings

Current squad

The Vannes squad for the 2021–22 season is:

Notable former players

See also
 List of rugby union clubs in France

References

External links
 Official website

Vannes
Sport in Vannes